Niklaus Aeschbacher (30 April 1917 – 30 November 1995) was a Swiss composer and conductor.

Born in Trogen in the canton of Appenzell Ausserrhoden as the son of Carl Aeschbacher, he studied music in Zürich and Berlin. After a post as conductor in Bern he became the chief conductor of the NHK Symphony Orchestra in Tokyo in 1954. but returned to Bern two years later. In 1964, he accepted a post in Detmold, where he taught at the music academy from 1972 to 1982.

Between 1930 and 1950, he wrote one opera, for the Swiss radio station DRS and a few pieces for orchestra, but also some chamber music.

Sources
Biographical note at Zentralbibliothek Zürich 
 

Swiss conductors (music)
Male conductors (music)
1917 births
1995 deaths
20th-century conductors (music)
20th-century male musicians